Futsal Klub Tirana or short FK Tirana are the most successful Albanian futsal club. In their short existence they have already won 11 major domestic trophies; 10 championships of the Albanian Futsal Championship, twice Cup winners and one trophy of the Nationwide Futsal Cup.

This is the futsal wing of SK Tirana Multisport Club.

FK Tirana have also participated in UEFA Futsal Cup (now UEFA Futsal Champions League) eleven times, most of any other Albanian futsal club. Few of these participations have been successful, such those of seasons 2004-05, 2006-07, 2018-19 and 2022-23 when they achieved important victories and were excluded from Main Round only due to a single lost match.

Domestic achievements 

Albanian Futsal Championship Champions - 10 (2003–04, 2005–06, 2007–08, 2008–09, 2009–10, 2015-16, 2017-18, 2018-19, 2020-21, 2021-22)

Albanian Futsal Cup Winners - 2 (2012, 2023)

International 

Nationwide Futsal Cup Winners - 1 (2010)

European Results 
Appearances: 11

Overall results

Current squad
The following players played the 2021–22 UEFA Futsal Champions League.

References

KF Tirana
Futsal clubs in Albania
2003 establishments in Albania
Futsal clubs established in 2003